The Liberty Bell Trail is a suburban rail trail under construction in southeastern Pennsylvania.

When complete it will cover  in suburban southeastern Pennsylvania, traveling from East Norriton Township in Montgomery County to Quakertown in Bucks County.

It was proposed in 1996, and partially follows the former path of the now defunct Liberty Bell Trolley Route, which had been operated by the Lehigh Valley Transit Company from around 1900 to 1951.

The tram route was named by the company for the Liberty Bell because a branch of it followed Bethlehem Pike, the road along which the bell was transported in September 1777 when it was being moved from Philadelphia to Northamptontown (now Allentown) for safekeeping shortly before the British occupation of Philadelphia during the American Revolutionary War. The trail has been named for both the trolley route and the bell.

The route passes through 15 municipalities (from south to north):
East Norriton Township
Whitpain Township
Upper Gwynedd Township
Lansdale Borough
Hatfield Township
Hatfield Borough
Franconia Township
Souderton Borough
Telford Borough
West Rockhill Township
Hilltown Township
Sellersville Borough
Perkasie Borough
Richland Township
Quakertown Borough

See also
 Liberty Bell Museum
 Frederick Leaser

References

External links
Liberty Bell Trail home
Maps of the route

Rail trails in Pennsylvania
Protected areas of Montgomery County, Pennsylvania
Protected areas of Bucks County, Pennsylvania